Béatrice Commengé (born 1949 in Algiers) is a French novelist and translator.

Biography 
After a Ph.D. on Virginia Woolf, she embarked on a master's degree in dance which culminated in the publication of her essay "The Dance of Nietzsche".

Her first novel, La Nuit est en avance d'un jour, was published in 1985 at Éditions Orban.
She translated the entire non-expunged Journal of Anaïs Nin.

A great traveler, she has contributed to many literary journals such as L'Infini, Les Cahiers de l'Herne, L'Atelier du roman,  on the internet or the magazine .

Béatrice Commengé obtained the Prix Cazes in 2004 for her book Et il ne pleut jamais, naturellement which was also selected for the prizes Femina and Wepler.

Works 
1985: La Nuit est en avance d'un jour, Orban
1988: La Danse de Nietzsche, Gallimard
1989: Le Ciel du voyageur, Gallimard
1991: Henry Miller, ange, clown, voyou, Plon
1995: Alexandrines, La Table Ronde
1998: L'Homme immobile, Gallimard
2003: Et il ne pleut jamais, naturellement, Gallimard
2007: En face du jardin - Six jours dans la vie de Rainer Maria Rilke, Flammarion, 
2009: Voyager vers des noms magnifiques, 
2011: L'occasion fugitive, 
2012: Flâneries anachroniques, Éditions Finitude
2015: Le Paris de Modiano, Éditions Alexandrines
2016: Une vie de paysages, 
2020: Alger, rue des Bananiers, Éditions Verdier

External links 
 Béatrice Commengé on Babelio
 Béatrice Commengé on Gallimard
 Béatrice Commengé on Éditions Verdier
 Béatrice Commengé on La revue des Ressources
 Béatrice Commengé: En face du jardin, six jours dans la vie de Maria Rainer on INA.fr (6 April 2007)

20th-century French non-fiction writers
21st-century French non-fiction writers
1949 births
People from Algiers
Living people
20th-century French women writers
21st-century French women writers